Webb Peak is a peak on Roa Ridge,  northwest of Matterhorn, in the Asgard Range of Victoria Land, Antarctica. It was named by the New Zealand Geographic Board (NZGB) in 1998 after Eric N. Webb, a New Zealand magnetician with the Australasian Antarctic Expedition (AAE), 1911–14, led by Douglas Mawson.

References

Mountains of the Asgard Range
McMurdo Dry Valleys